The  , rendered in English as the Logothete of the Military or Military Logothete, was a Byzantine imperial official in charge of the pay and provisioning of the Byzantine army. The office appears in the late 7th century and is mentioned until the 14th century.

History and functions
This duty was originally exercised by the praetorian prefecture, but the military chest was eventually detached and formed as a separate  (department). The first attested  was Julian, the "most glorious  and " in 680. 

The exact sphere of duties of the Military Logothete is somewhat obscure. The only direct evidence as to his functions comes from the De Ceremoniis of Emperor Constantine VII Porphyrogennetos, according to which he oversaw the imposition and exemption from taxes on the households of soldiers. It is also known that by the 11th century, he exercised some juridical functions. Several scholars (notably Ernst Stein) have argued that the Military Logothete supervised military affairs in general, such as the levying of troops, the construction of fortifications and the overall military expenditure. This hypothesis, however, cannot be proved.

Subordinate officials

The  (from Latin ), officials responsible for the distribution of pay to the troops.

List of known 

References

Sources

 
 
 
 
 
 

Byzantine fiscal offices
Byzantine military offices